Egidio Massaria (2 September 1925 – 21 October 1995) was an Italian swimmer. He competed in two events at the 1952 Summer Olympics.

References

External links
 

1925 births
1995 deaths
Italian male swimmers
Olympic swimmers of Italy
Swimmers at the 1952 Summer Olympics
Sportspeople from Venice
Swimmers at the 1955 Mediterranean Games